Rajya Sabha elections were held on various dates in 1993, to elect members of the Rajya Sabha, Indian Parliament's upper chamber.1 member from Goa, 3 members from Gujarat and 6 members from West Bengal are elected.

Elections
Elections were held to elect members from various states.

Members elected
The following members are elected in the elections held in 1993. They are members for the term 1993-1999 and retire in year 1999, except in case of the resignation or death before the term.
The list is incomplete.

State - Member - Party

Bye-elections
The following bye elections were held in the year 1993.

State - Member - Party

 BH - Braham Deo Anand Paswan - JD ( ele 01/06/1993 term till 1994 )
 HR - Dinesh Singh - INC ( ele 06/07/1993 term till 1998 ) dea 30/11/1995
 MH - Govindrao Adik - INC ( ele 03/08/1993 term till 1994 )

References

1993 elections in India
1993